On 8 February 2016, the Islamic State of Iraq and the Levant executed over 300 police and army personnel, as well as civil activists by a firing squad in Mosul, Iraq.

See also
 List of terrorist incidents, January–June 2016
 Mass executions in ISIL-occupied Mosul

References

2016 murders in Iraq
21st-century mass murder in Iraq
ISIL terrorist incidents in Iraq
Massacre
Massacres in 2016
Mass murder in 2016
Terrorist incidents in Iraq in 2016
Massacres of the War in Iraq (2013–2017) perpetrated by ISIL
February 2016 crimes in Asia
Islamic terrorist incidents in 2016